Mark David Sale (born 27 February 1972) is an English former professional footballer who played as a forward. He made more than 200 appearances in the Football League and many more in non-league football. He was first-team coach of Birmingham City from October 2014 to December 2016. In March 2017 he was appointed first-team coach at Derby County. He was appointed first-team at Stoke City in June 2018.

Playing career
Sale was born in Burton upon Trent, Staffordshire, and began his career as a trainee with Stoke City. He made his league debut away to Brighton & Hove Albion in May 1990 and played the following week in the home game against Swindon Town.

He was released by Stoke without playing any further first team games and joined non-league Rocester from where he joined Birmingham City in March 1992. He moved to Torquay United for a fee of £10,000 and had a successful forward partnership with Duane Darby. His form at Torquay led to a £20,000 move to Preston North End where he had limited success.

In July 1995 he joined Mansfield Town for a fee of £50,000 and immediately joined his new teammates in a pre-season tour of Cyprus. He was in and out of the side and in March 1997 was sold to Colchester United for a fee of £23,500. His first game for Colchester came in a 2–1 win against Mansfield. Later in the season he played at Wembley in the final of the Football League Trophy.

He left Colchester in July 1999, joining Rushden & Diamonds for a fee of £30,000. He began the season as a regular in the side, but was soon diagnosed with Hodgkin's disease and underwent chemotherapy. He made a full recovery and returned to Rushden's side in December 2000, though was to play only twice as Rushden won the Conference and with it promotion to the Football League.

Sale joined Doncaster Rovers in May 2001, played 15 times in the Conference, and was released at the end of the 2001–02 season. He initially agreed terms with Conference side Forest Green Rovers, but that fell through and he joined Tamworth in August 2002. He had a loan spell with Hucknall Town in September 2003 before moving to Alfreton Town in October 2003. In June 2005 he moved on to join Northwich Victoria, rejoining his former Hucknall manager Steve Burr, and helped Northwich to promotion back to the Conference National. Sale left Northwich in January 2007 to join Hednesford Town, but did not appear for the first team.

In January 2008 he was appointed youth-team manager at Burton Albion, a role which he combined with working as football development officer for East Staffordshire Borough Council. When Burton manager Gary Rowett was appointed manager of Birmingham City in October 2014, Sale accompanied him as first-team coach. Rowett and his staff, Sale included, were sacked in December 2016. On 14 March 2017, he once again linked up with Rowett, this time as first-team coach of Derby County.

Sale followed Rowett to Stoke City in June 2018. He left Stoke on 8 January 2019.

Career statistics
Source:

Honours

Club
Colchester United
 Football League Third Division play-off winner: 1997–98
 Football League Trophy runner-up: 1996–97

Northwich Victoria
 Conference North: 2005–06

References

External links
 

1972 births
Living people
Sportspeople from Burton upon Trent
English footballers
Association football forwards
Stoke City F.C. players
Cambridge United F.C. players
Rocester F.C. players
Birmingham City F.C. players
Torquay United F.C. players
Preston North End F.C. players
Mansfield Town F.C. players
Colchester United F.C. players
Plymouth Argyle F.C. players
Rushden & Diamonds F.C. players
Doncaster Rovers F.C. players
Tamworth F.C. players
Hucknall Town F.C. players
Alfreton Town F.C. players
Northwich Victoria F.C. players
Hednesford Town F.C. players
English Football League players
National League (English football) players
Burton Albion F.C. non-playing staff
Birmingham City F.C. non-playing staff
Derby County F.C. non-playing staff
Stoke City F.C. non-playing staff